Floirac is a commune in the Gironde department in Nouvelle-Aquitaine in southwestern France.

Population

Twin towns
Floirac is twinned with:
 Diébougou, Burkina Faso
 Burlada, Spain, since 1985

See also 
 Bordeaux Observatory
 Communes of the Gironde department

References

Communes of Gironde